Anju Bobby George (born 19 April 1977) is a retired Indian athlete. Anju Bobby George made history when she won the bronze medal in long jump at the 2003 World Championships in Athletics in Paris. With this achievement, she became the first Indian athlete ever to win a medal in a World Championships in Athletics jumping . She went on to win the gold medal at the IAAF World Athletics Final (a competition between best eight athletes in the world based on the world ranking) in 2005, a performance she considers her best. Anju was upgraded to the gold status from silver in the 2005 World Athletics Final in Monte Carlo following the disqualification of Tatyana Kotova of Russia by the International Association of Athletics Federations, following the recent re-testing of the latter's sample collected at the 2005 World Championship in Helsinki. She was awarded the Arjuna Award in 2002, Khel Ratna in 2003 and Padma Shri in 2004. In March 2021, Anju won the BBC lifetime achievement award for best athlete in India. She is also the current vice-president of the Athletics Federation of India.

Early life
Anju was born in Kochuparambil family in Cheeranchira village of Changanassery taluk, Kottayam, Kerala, in a Syrian Orthodox family, to K. T. Markose.

Professional career
Anju made history when she won the bronze medal clearing 6.70 m in Long Jump at the 2003 World Championships in Athletics in Paris, becoming the first Indian athlete ever to win a medal in a World Championships in Athletics. She also won a gold medal at the 2003 Afro-Asian Games. She achieved her personal best of 6.83 m at the 2004 Olympic Games at Athens which brought her the fifth position. This is the current Indian national record.

She received the Arjuna award in 2002–2003 for eminent sportspersons from the government of India and the country's highest sporting honour, Rajiv Gandhi Khel Ratna award in 2003–2004 after her success in the World Athletic meet. She was conferred Padma Shri, India's fourth highest civilian award in 2004.

Anju Bobby George pulled out of the 52nd national inter-state athletics in Hyderabad, due to an upper respiratory tract infection.

Personal life
Anju is married to Robert Bobby George, who is a former national champion in triple jump and her coach too. She is employed with the Customs department in Bangalore. The couple have a son Aaron and a daughter Andrea.

Involvement with sports association
Anju was appointed as president of the Kerala State Sports Council (KSSC). She resigned from the post on 22 June 2016.

See also
 India at the 2008 Summer Olympics
 List of Indian records in athletics
 List of Indian sportswomen
 List of Kerala Olympians

References

External links
 

1977 births
21st-century Indian people
21st-century Indian women
Asian Games gold medalists for India
Asian Games medalists in athletics (track and field)
Asian Games silver medalists for India
Athletes (track and field) at the 2002 Asian Games
Athletes (track and field) at the 2002 Commonwealth Games
Athletes (track and field) at the 2004 Summer Olympics
Athletes (track and field) at the 2006 Asian Games
Athletes (track and field) at the 2008 Summer Olympics
Athletes from Kerala
Commonwealth Games bronze medallists for India
Commonwealth Games medallists in athletics
Indian Eastern Catholics
Indian female long jumpers
Living people
Malayali people
Medalists at the 2002 Asian Games
Medalists at the 2006 Asian Games
Olympic athletes of India
People from Changanassery
Recipients of the Arjuna Award
Recipients of the Khel Ratna Award
Recipients of the Padma Shri in sports
South Asian Games gold medalists for India
South Asian Games medalists in athletics
Sportswomen from Kerala
World Athletics Championships medalists
Indian sports executives and administrators
Medallists at the 2002 Commonwealth Games